In Greek mythology, Hippolytus (Greek: Ἱππόλυτος Hippolytos; "unleasher of horses") may refer to the following personages:

 Hippolytus, son of Theseus.
 Hippolytus, an Egyptian prince as one of the sons of King Aegyptus. He suffered the same fate as his other brothers, save Lynceus, when they were slain on their wedding night by their wives who obeyed the command of their father King Danaus of Libya. Hippolytus was the son of Aegyptus by an Arabian woman and thus full brother of Istrus, Chalcodon, Agenor, Chaetus, Diocorystes, Alces, Alcmenor, Hippothous and Euchenor. In some accounts, he could be a son of Aegyptus either by Eurryroe, daughter of the river-god Nilus, or Isaie, daughter of King Agenor of Tyre. Hippolytus  married the Danaid Rhode, daughter of Danaus either by the hamadryads Atlanteia or Phoebe.
Hippolytus, one of the Gigantes, slain by Hermes who was wearing Hades's helmet of invisibility.
 Hippolytus, a lover of Aegiale, wife of Diomedes.
 Hippolytus, father of Deiphobus of Amyclae (the one who cleansed Heracles for the murder of Iphitus).
 Hippolytus, successor to Zeuxippus as king of Sicyon, son of Rhopalus, grandson of Phaestus and father of Lacestades.
 Hippolytus of Sicyon, beloved of Apollo.

Notes

References 

 Apollodorus, The Library with an English Translation by Sir James George Frazer, F.B.A., F.R.S. in 2 Volumes, Cambridge, MA, Harvard University Press; London, William Heinemann Ltd. 1921. ISBN 0-674-99135-4. Online version at the Perseus Digital Library. Greek text available from the same website.
 Pausanias, Description of Greece with an English Translation by W.H.S. Jones, Litt.D., and H.A. Ormerod, M.A., in 4 Volumes. Cambridge, MA, Harvard University Press; London, William Heinemann Ltd. 1918. . Online version at the Perseus Digital Library
 Pausanias, Graeciae Descriptio. 3 vols. Leipzig, Teubner. 1903.  Greek text available at the Perseus Digital Library.
 Tzetzes, John, Book of Histories, Book VII-VIII translated by Vasiliki Dogani from the original Greek of T. Kiessling's edition of 1826. Online version at theio.com

Kings in Greek mythology
LGBT themes in Greek mythology
Male lovers of Apollo
Sons of Aegyptus
Gigantes